Berhampore is a city and a municipality in the state of West Bengal, India. As per the 2011 census, Berhampore has a population of 305,609 and is the seventh largest city in West Bengal (after Kolkata, Asansol, Siliguri, Durgapur, Bardhaman and Malda). Berhampore is the administrative headquarters of the Murshidabad district. It is one of the most important business, administrative, educational and political hub of Bengal as well as of India. Congress Lok Sabha leader Shri Adhir Ranjan Chowdhury has been elected from this city since 1999. It is one of the most popular urban agglomerations of West Bengal state. It was the first centre of East India Company in India. Not only the British but also the Dutch and the French established their companies in this city and, as a result, it grew as a production hub of India. It is famous for its famous sweets such as Chanabora, Manohara, Rasgulla and many more. The city is divided into five administrative regions: Gora Bazar, Khagra, Indraprastha, Cossimbazar, Haridasmati. Berhampore was a part of Sepoy Mutiny of 1857 which took place at Berhampore Cantonment region (Barrack Square). It was used by many foreign traders as their production hub. Before becoming a city many janpadas such as Saidabad; Farasdanga; Kalikapur had become famous. Cossimbazar had also become world famous for its muslin clothes. This city used to be the headquarters of Rajshahi administrative region till 1875.

History
Berhampore was fortified in 1757 by the East India Company, after the Battle of Plassey in June 1757, and it continued as a cantonment until 1870. But the foundation of the city of Berhampore remains questionable.

Karnasubarna, which is very near to Berhampore, has a history dating back to 600 AD. Many buildings from the late 1600s can still be seen. It used to be known as Brahmapur because many of the Brahmin families settled here. The cantonment was constituted as a municipality in 1876 and was the headquarters of Murshidabad district. The Berhampore College was founded in 1853 and in 1888 made over to a local committee, mainly supported by Rani Swarnamayi.
On 27 February 1857, the first major armed battle of the Indian Rebellion of 1857 took place in Barrack Square, Berhampore. Berhampore was ruled by Raja Krishnath, his ancestors and successors (he was succeeded by his sister's side of the family as he did not have any direct descendants). In 1901, Berhampore had a population of 24,397, and included the ancient town of Kasim Bazar.

Geography

Location
It has an average elevation of 18 metres (59 feet).

Note: The map alongside presents some of the notable locations in the subdivisions. All places marked in the map are linked in the larger full screen map.

Civic administration

Police station
Berhampore police station has jurisdiction over Berhampore municipal area and a part of Berhampore CD Block.

Climate

Demographics

In the 2011 census, Berhampore Urban Agglomeration had a population of 305,609, out of which 156,489 were males and 149,120 were females. The 0–6 years population was 23,182. Effective literacy rate for the 7+ population was 88.38. Bengali is the predominant language, spoken by 98.02% of the population. Hindi is spoken by 1.46%.

 Indian census, Berhampore had a population of 160,168. Males constitute 51% of the population and females 49%. Berhampore has an average literacy rate of 79%, higher than the national average of 59.5%, with 53% of the males and 47% of females literate. 9% of the population is under 6 years of age.

Economics
Initially, most of the residents of this city were government employees and there were few agricultural as well as silk traders. Gradually, the importance of the city increased due to its geographic location. Due to its historical importance, this city also earns a good number of tourists, thus making tourism another prominent industry there.

Major industries include agricultural related industries like rice and oil-seed milling. Home-crafts like silk weaving, ivory carving, and precious metal working are other important industries in this city. Khagra, a neighbourhood in Bahrampur is renowned for its manufacture of bell-metal and brass utensils, as well as ivory, and wood carving. A famous type of metal used to make bells called "Khagrai Kansha" is made in the city. This is a type of brass that is used to make utensils like dishes & bowls.

The city has many big shops which now have become prime shopping destinations.

The multiplexes in the town include Silver Screen which is located near Berhampore Court railway station and Mohan Multiplex inside Mohan Mall. 

Berhampore is famous for the sweet chhanabora, the savoury khaja, and the sweet manohara. It is also known for Murshidabad silk (tassar).

Kalika is being used in most of the sweet shops, goldsmiths' shops and many other small scale industries. The name Kalika is the Goddess Kali.

Transport

Rail – Berhampore is 186 km from Kolkata by train. Main trains are the Bhagirathi Express (13103/13104), Hazarduari Express (13113/13114), and Dhano Dhanye Express (13117/13118). Other passenger trains include Sealdah–Lalgola passenger, Sealdah–Berhampore Court MEMU passenger, Ranaghat Jn–Lalgola EMU Locals, Krishnanagar City Jn–Lalgola EMU Locals. In the northern part of the town there is another railway station named , which is the next railway station on the Sealdah–Lalgola route.

Khagraghat Road (KGLE) station stands on the Howrah–Azimganj Junction line of the Eastern Railway. Main trains of this line are Sealdah–New Alipurduar Teesta–Torsa Express, Howrah–Dibrugarh Kamrup Express, Kolkata–Radhikapur Express, Hatey Bazare Express, Howrah–Malda Town Intercity Express, Puri–Kamakhya express via Howrah, Digha–New Jalpaiguri Paharia express, and Nabadwip Dham–Malda Town Express.

Road – As Berhampore is the administrative headquarters of the Murshidabad district and stands just in a central position of West Bengal, it acts as the link between North Bengal and South Bengal. This town is well connected by NH 12 and National Highway 34. The local transportation is heavily dependent on rickshaws and E-rickshaws (known as tuk-tuk or toto car). There are bus services on regular basis from South Bengal to North Bengal and vice versa.

There are two bus terminals in the city – one for the government bus services and the other bus terminus for private buses is called 'Mohona'. There are regular bus services to Kolkata (Esplanade). Bus services are also available to other parts of West Bengal such as Durgapur, Sainthia, Asansol, Burdwan, Bankura, Jhargram, Bolpur, Rampurhat, Nalhati, Kirnahar, Malda, Siliguri, Balurghat, Gangarampur, Krishnanagar, Ranaghat. Bus service is also available to Dumka (Jharkhand).

Water – Berhampore city is situated on the banks of Bhagirathi. Berhampore north to Berhampore south is connected via launchboats. Regular boat transport is also available from Berhampore to other towns of Murshidabad such as Azimganj and Jiaganj.

Tourist spots

Berhampore is a famous place for tourists in West Bengal. It gets tourists' flow from locals as well as from foreigners, being the first headquarters of the East India Company  and having a long history enriched by the Nawabs of Bengal, Sultans of Bengal, Zamindar and other European colonial forces such as Dutch, Portuguese, English (British Raj) and French.

Arts and culture

Having patronage from the Nawabs, artists from various field of arts sowed the seed of cultural heritage in this place. The calm lifestyle of this city still evokes a rich cultural environment. Almost all well-to-do parents send their children to at least one school of art. Among them, dancing, acting, recitation, painting, and music are the most popular.

Elegant pieces of hand-craft arts can also be found in this region, namely the handcraft in making of carpet, bamboo and jute crafts, and miniature paintings.

This city can be considered one of the main cultural hubs of West Bengal. 'Rabindra Sadan' named after Bengal's very own Nobel Laureate Rabindranath Tagore is the place where most of the indoor cultural activities take place.

Theatre groups like Berhampore Repertory Theater, Rangasram, Chhandik, Jugagni and Prantik are based out of this town. These groups organise theatre festivals throughout the year mostly during the winter season. These festivals allow people from the city, nearby towns and villages to witness performances from different theatre groups from all over the state, different states and even groups from across the border of Bangladesh. A relatively new theatre group, Berhampore Gangchil, has started their own productions focusing on junior school students.

Education 
Among the government-aided high schools for boys, Krishnath College School, Berhampore, Berhampore J.N. Academy, Iswar Chandra Institution (ICI), Gurudas Tarasundari Institution (GTI) and Saidabad Manindra Chandra Vidyapith (MCV) are the most popular ones.

The high school for girls include Berhampore Maharani Kashiswari Girls High School, Mahakali Pathshala, Shrish Chandra Vidyapith and Lipika Memorial Girls' High school.

All the above-mentioned schools are affiliated with State Bengal Board and are Bengali medium schools.

There are also private schools like Gitaram Academy, Prabharani Public School, Mary Immaculate School, Don Bosco School, 
Viddyottam Public School which are affiliated with the Central Board of Secondary Education or Indian Certificate of Secondary Education|Council for Indian School Certificate Examinations are English medium schools.

The city also has a Kendriya Vidyalaya, situated close to Babul Bona Road, the first Secondary batch having graduated from the school in 2001.

Jawahar Navodaya Vidyalaya is in swarnomoyee road near Berhampore Court Station.

University
 Murshidabad University

Colleges

Berhampore College was initially founded in 1963 as Raja Krishnath College of Commerce, and was renamed in 1975. It is located in Berhampore.
Berhampore Girls' College was established at Berhampore in 1946.
Central Sericultural Research and Training Institute is a research station conducted by the Central Silk Board, Ministry of Textiles, Government of India, established at Berhampore in 1943. It conducts a regular post-graduate course in sericulture and tailor-made courses.
Government College of Engineering & Textile Technology, Berhampore was established at Berhampore in 1927.
Krishnath College (named Berhampore College until 1902) was established at Berhampore in 1853. In addition to undergraduate courses it offers post-graduate courses in physiology, sericulture and Sanskrit.
Murshidabad College of Engineering & Technology was established at Berhampore in 1998.
Murshidabad Institute of Technology was established in 1956.
Murshidabad Medical College and Hospital was established at Berhampore in 2012.

Monarch College of Art and Technology is a private college at Berhampore offering courses in animation film making and ceramic design.
Prabharani Public School was established on the outskirts of Berhampore in 2003. The school is part of Kalyan Bharti Trust, which has Bengali medium schools, B.Ed. colleges along with this CBSE school.
Union Christian Training College was established at Berhampore in 1938. It is affiliated with the West Bengal University of Teachers' Training, Education Planning and Administration for its BEd course, and with the University of Kalyani for its BPEd course.

Legacy
The city of Berhampore also shares its name with Berhampore at Wellington, New Zealand. The daughter of Major Paul married local land owner George Hunter. Major Paul was an Indian Army officer. George Hunter to show respect to his father in law gave Berhampore the name of the suburb.
The old house of the "De" family (relatives of the Cossimbazar Raj) at Churamani Chowdhury Lane is also one of the oldest buildings in Berhampore and was at one point of time the property of the Cossimbazar Raj.

Notable people
 
 
Rakhaldas Bandyopadhyay, historian (known popularly for unearthing the ruins at Mohenjo-Daro and Indus Valley Civilization)
Nabarun Bhattacharya, writer
Atin Bandopadhyay, writer
Syad Mustafa Siraj, writer
Arup Chandra, poet, writer 
Tridib Chaudhuri, politician
Arijit Singh, singer
Adhir Ranjan Chowdhury, politician
Manju Dey, actress
Manish Ghatak, poet of Kallol era
Mahasweta Devi, writer
Shreya Ghoshal, playback singer
Braja Bhusan Gupta, Nationalist politician
Sir George Francis Hill, Director and Principal Librarian of the British Museum (1931–1936)
Micaiah John Muller Hill, British mathematician
Moniruddin Khan, writer
Sudip Roy, artist
Baikuntha Nath Sen, politician and social worker
Satyarup Siddhanta, mountaineer
Ramendra Sundar Tribedi, writer

References

Sources
Encyclopedia.Com
Encyclopædia Britannica
The Columbia Encyclopedia

External links

Map of Murshidabad district on CalcuttaWeb.com
Latitude and longitude locations maps in India
City populations in West Bengal
 

Cities and towns in Murshidabad district
Berhampore
Cities in West Bengal